Jared Johnson (born December 9, 1986), best known by the stage name Jaida Essence Hall, is an American drag queen and reality television personality best known for winning the twelfth season of RuPaul's Drag Race, and later returning to compete on the seventh season of RuPaul's Drag Race All Stars, an all-winners season. Since her season aired in 2020, Hall has been a staple of several domestic and international tours that feature Drag Race contestants, including Werq the World, A Drag Queen Christmas, and Drive 'N Drag. In October 2020, Johnson was a featured performer in Rihanna's Savage X Fenty Fashion Show Vol. 2.

Early life 
Johnson was born in Milwaukee, Wisconsin. He is the third contestant from the city to compete on RuPaul's Drag Race and the second winner after Trixie Mattel (winner of All Stars Season 3). He cites Milwaukee's sense of community and diversity of drag as major influences, especially its country tongue. He performed for a period of time at Hamburger Mary's.

Career 
Johnson began drag in the early 2010s. Her name is a product of personal anecdotes and experiences that hold meaning. A friend called her "Jaida" when she put on a wig for the first time, and the name stuck. "Essence" came from her boyfriend, who called her "the essence of beauty" in a text message. "Hall" is the name of her drag family; her mothers are Tajma Hall and Prada Diamond, and her drag sisters are Mercedes Iman Diamond, Dida Ritz, and Kahmora Hall.

She rose to prominence in the drag scene through pageantry, winning titles such as Miss Five, Miss Gay Madison, Miss Wisconsin Club, and Miss City of the Lakes. She also performed a halftime show at a 2019 Milwaukee Bucks game.

Jaida is known for her design eye and makes many of her own outfits; her boyfriend makes her jewelry. She is also a makeup artist and painted Silky Nutmeg Ganache's face for the season eleven finale of RuPaul's Drag Race.

In July and August 2020, Hall on toured with Drive 'N Drag, a drive-in drag show held outdoors to accommodate social distancing restrictions imposed due to COVID-19. Johnson was featured on the cover of the September issue of Attitude magazine in 2020. In October 2020, Johnson was a featured performer in Rihanna's Savage X Fenty Fashion Show Vol. 2.

In September 2021, she performed alongside Christina Aguilera at LadyLand Festival. The following month, she performed at PridetoberFest at Henry Maier Festival Park in Milwaukee, and the 10th annual Night of the Living Drag: The North American Halloween Tour. In December, she will perform at the 2021 A Drag Queen Christmas event, produced by Murray & Peter.

In January 2022, Jaida Essence Hall was added to the rotating cast of a dozen Drag Race queens in RuPaul's Drag Race Live!, a Las Vegas show residency at the Flamingo Las Vegas. In March, Jaida Essence Hall, alongside the rest of the RuPaul's Drag Race Live! cast, performed with Katy Perry during her Play concert residency at Resorts World Las Vegas. In April 2022, she will host a Grammy-inspired Fashion Show sponsored by TikTok.

RuPaul's Drag Race 
Jaida was announced as a contestant on the twelfth season of RuPaul's Drag Race on January 23, 2020. During her time on the show, she won three main challenges, including the Fosse-style number on episode two, the political debate on episode nine, and the makeover on episode ten. She also had one appearance in the bottom two, after a shaky performance in the one-woman show on episode eleven. Jaida ultimately sent fan favorite, and eventual Miss Congeniality winner, Heidi N Closet, home after a lip sync showdown to Prince's hit song "1999". She was crowned the winner (virtually) on May 29, 2020 after winning a three-way lip sync against Crystal Methyd and Gigi Goode to "Survivor" by Destiny's Child. This performance earned Jaida a nomination for the 2020 People's Choice Awards, in the Competition Contestant category.

She returned in the eleventh episode of the sixth season of RuPaul's Drag Race All Stars as a "Lip Sync Assassin", where she lipsynced against Eureka! to Little Richard's "Good Golly Miss Molly".

In April 2022, Jaida Essence Hall was announced as one of the eight returning winners that would be competing in seventh season of RuPaul's Drag Race All Stars, the first ever all-winners season of Drag Race. She won the third episode, and successfully lipsynced against Trinity the Tuck to Beyonce's "Green Light".

Personal life
Johnson identifies as queer.
He currently lives in West Allis.

Filmography

Movies

Television

Music videos

Web series

Discography

Featured singles

References

External links 
 
 
 

Living people
African-American drag queens
American drag queens
American make-up artists
Gay entertainers
LGBT people from Wisconsin
People from Milwaukee
RuPaul's Drag Race winners
LGBT African Americans
Queer people
1986 births
RuPaul's Drag Race All Stars contestants